Troitsk is a town in Troitsky Administrative Okrug of the federal city of Moscow, Russia, located on the Desna River  southwest from the center of Moscow on the Kaluzhskoye Highway. Population: 39,873 (2010 Census); 32,653 (2002 Census);

History
Troitsk was first mentioned in 1646 as a settlement of Troitskoye. It was renamed Troitsk and granted town status in 1977. Until July 1, 2012, it was a part of Moscow Oblast but was transferred to Moscow's jurisdiction along with other territories in the southwest.

Administrative and municipal status
On July 1, 2012 Troitsk was transferred to the city of Moscow and became a part of the newly established Troitsky Administrative Okrug.

Prior to the transfer, within the framework of administrative divisions, it was incorporated as Troitsk Town Under Oblast Jurisdiction—an administrative unit with the status equal to that of the districts. As a municipal division, Troitsk Town Under Oblast Jurisdiction was incorporated as Troitsk Urban Okrug.

Research
It is home of a number of research institutes of the Russian Academy of Sciences, including:
 Institute for Nuclear Research
 Pushkov Institute of Terrestrial Magnetism, Ionosphere and Radio Wave Propagation of the Russian Academy of Sciences, IZMIRAN
 Institute for High Pressure Physics Russian Academy of Sciences 
 Institute for Spectroscopy of the Russian Academy of Sciences
 Technological Institute for Superhard and Novel Carbon Materials 
 Troitsk Institute of Innovative and Thermonuclear Research
 Branch of Lebedev Physical Institute

References

Notes

Sources

External links
Troitsk online community 

Cities and towns in Moscow (federal city)
Troitsky Administrative Okrug
Naukograds